Cañada Garcia Creek is a perennial stream in southwest Santa Clara County, California, United States.  The headwaters rise on the southern flank of Portezuelo Gap near Manzanita Ridge in the eastern foothills of the Santa Cruz Mountains.  From there, the creek flows southeastward, eventually merging with Llagas Creek.

History
In Spanish, the word "cañada" means "ravine".  The valley around the ravine and creek was once part of the larger Pueblo Tract Nº 3 and Rancho Las Uvas lands granted in the mid-19th century.

Ecology
Cañada Garcia is one of several serpentine valley habitats identified as helping to sustain Bay checkerspot butterfly populations.

See also
Riparian zone

References

External links
 

Rivers of Santa Clara County, California
Rivers of Northern California